ISSSC may refer to:

 Institute for the Study of Secularism in Society and Culture, at Trinity College in Hartford, Connecticut
 International Society for the Suppression of Savage Customs, a fictional society in the 1899 novel Heart of Darkness by Joseph Conrad